Daniil Medvedev defeated Novak Djokovic in the final, 6–4, 6–4, 6–4 to win the men's singles tennis title at the 2021 US Open. It was his first major title and he only lost one set en route (against Botic van de Zandschulp in the quarterfinals). Medvedev became the third Russian man, after Yevgeny Kafelnikov and Marat Safin, to win a major singles title, and the first to do so since Safin at the 2005 Australian Open.

Dominic Thiem was the reigning champion, but did not participate due to an ongoing wrist injury.

Djokovic was aiming to become the second man in the Open Era, after Rod Laver in 1969, to complete a Grand Slam. He was also attempting to win an outright record 21st major singles title and surpass his Big Three counterparts, Roger Federer and Rafael Nadal. By reaching the final, Djokovic tied Federer's record of 31 men's singles major finals contested, and repeated his 2015 achievement of contesting the maximum-possible 28 major singles matches in a season. This marked Djokovic's record sixth runner-up finish at the event.

By defeating world No. 3 Stefanos Tsitsipas in the third round, Carlos Alcaraz became the youngest man to beat a top 3 ranked-player in singles at the US Open since the inception of the ATP rankings in 1973. He became the youngest male quarterfinalist at a singles major since Michael Chang at the 1989 French Open, and the youngest at the US Open in the Open Era; he would go on to win the title the following year. Van de Zandschulp became the first Dutchman to reach a singles major quarterfinal since Sjeng Schalken at the 2004 Wimbledon Championships and the first qualifier to do so at the US Open since Gilles Müller in 2008.

Seeds

Draw

Finals

Top half

Section 1

Section 2

Section 3

Section 4

Bottom half

Section 5

Section 6

Section 7

Section 8

Seeded players
The following are the seeded players. Seedings are based on ATP rankings as of August 23, 2021. Rank and points before are as of August 30, 2021.

As a result of pandemic-related adjustments to the ranking system, players are defending the greater of their points from the 2019 and 2020 tournaments. 

† Because the 2020 tournament was non-mandatory, the player was defending 150 points from his 19th best result instead of 90 points from the 2020 US Open.
‡ The player was also defending points from one or more 2019 ATP Challenger Tour tournaments. Those points were frozen in 2020 as a result of pandemic-related adjustments to the ranking system.
§ The player did not qualify for the tournament in 2019 or 2020 and is defending points from a 2020 ATP Challenger Tour tournament (Ostrava) instead.
^ Because the 2021 tournament was non-mandatory, the player substituted his 19th best result in place of the points won in this tournament.

Withdrawn players
The following players would have been seeded, but withdrew before the tournament began. 

^ Because the 2021 tournament was non-mandatory, the player substituted his 19th best result in place of zero points for this tournament.

Other entry information

Wild card entries

Qualifiers

Lucky losers

Protected ranking
  Philipp Kohlschreiber (96)

Withdrawals

See also 
2021 US Open – Day-by-day summaries

Explanatory notes

References

External links

Men's Singles
US Open – Men's Singles
US Open (tennis) by year – Men's singles